Park Village, California may refer to:
 Park Village, El Dorado County, California
 Park Village, Inyo County, California